Ryan is a suburb in the City of Mount Isa, Queensland, Australia.

Geography 
The Leichhard River flows north–south through the town of Mount Isa, dividing the suburbs of the town into "mineside" (west of the Leichhardt River) and "townside" (east of the Leichhardt River). Ryan is a "townside" suburb.

History 
Ryan was named on 1 September 1973 by the Queensland Place Names Board after Dr Edward Joseph Ryan, the medical superintendent of the Mount Isa District Hospital during World War II. On 16 March 2001 the status of Ryan was changed from a locality to a suburb.

References 

City of Mount Isa
Suburbs in Queensland